Duane Lyman (1886–1966) was an architect based in Buffalo, New York, known for his prolific career which included 100 school buildings, many churches, and numerous large homes both in the city and suburban communities. At the time of his death, Lyman was referred to as the "dean of Western New York Architecture."

Early life
Lyman was born in Lockport, New York, the son of Richard B. and Molly Hayes Lyman. He attended Lafayette High School in Buffalo and in 1908, graduated from Yale University's Sheffield Scientific School, where he studied architecture and mechanical engineering.

Career
After graduating in 1908, he traveled abroad to Europe, staying until 1913 and the eve of World War I. He returned to the United States, settling in Buffalo and started an architecture practice.  He was chief in three firms: Lansing Bley & Lyman (1912–1919), Bley & Lyman (1919–ca. 1939), and Lyman & Associates (ca. 1939–1966).  Lyman volunteered for military service during World War I, serving in the nation's capital, and left with the rank of major.

Some of Lyman's papers survive in the collection of the Buffalo History Museum.

Selected works

 Vars Mausoleum at Forest Lawn Cemetery
 1915: Bert Lee Jones Residence, Derby NY, 6980 Lakeshore Rd.
 1922: Saturn Club, listed on the National Register of Historic Places in 2005.
 1924: American Radiator Company Factory Complex, additions to the Institute of Thermal Research, Buffalo, New York
 1927: Country Club of Buffalo clubhouse, Buffalo, New York
 1929: Annie Lang Miller House (Nottingham), Buffalo, New York
 1934: Edwin M. and Emily S. Johnston House, listed on the National Register of Historic Places in 1997.
 1936: Federal Courthouse at Niagara Square, Buffalo, New York
 1937: Old Trees (remodeling), Cazenovia, New York, listed on the National Register of Historic Places in 1991.
 1950: Christ the King Chapel, Canisius College
 1950: Williamsville Junior and Senior High School (now Williamsville South High School), Amherst, New York, listed on the National Register of Historic Places in 2008.
 1957: House at 8 Berkley Drive, Lockport, New York, listed on the National Register of Historic Places in 2009.
 1961: Liberty Building (addition)
 1963: Diefendorf Hall, University at Buffalo, The State University of New York
 1966: M&T Bank Center, Buffalo

Personal life
In 1911, he married Elizabeth Stimson, with whom he had three daughters.  Lyman hunted and fished on his near 100 acre farm near South Wales, in Western New York and Canada, fished in Florida and New Brunswick, Canada, and at his hunting and fishing lodge near Bic in Quebec (since 1955), where he was a member of the Anglo-American Fish & Game Club of Bic.  He was also a member of the Saturn Club in Buffalo and a life member and director of the Buffalo Fine Arts Academy. Lyman died on April 30, 1966 at his home on 78 Oakland Place in Buffalo, which he designed and built in 1948. He was interred at Forest Lawn Cemetery, Buffalo.

References

External links
Canisius College - Christ the King Chapel
 Duane Lyman and Associates, Architects, Records 1923-1975, 1952-1963: An inventory at EmpireADC.org, courtesy of the Buffalo History Museum.
Michael J. Dillon U.S. Courthouse, Buffalo, NY
UB Buildings: Diefendorf Hall
 Welcome to The Miller Mansion (Nottingham)

1886 births
1966 deaths
20th-century American architects
Architects from Buffalo, New York
Yale School of Engineering & Applied Science alumni
People from Lockport, New York
Lafayette High School (Buffalo, New York) alumni